Phalanx (1944–1971) was an American Champion Thoroughbred racehorse. In 1947, he won the Belmont Stakes and was voted American Champion Three-Year-Old Male Horse.

Background
He was sired by Pilate, a son of the 1916 Belmont Stakes winner, Friar Rock. His dam was the outstanding runner Jacola, the American Champion Two-Year-Old Filly of 1937 who beat Seabiscuit by two lengths in the 1938 Laurel Stakes.

Phalanx was conditioned for racing by future U.S. Racing Hall of Fame trainer Syl Veitch.

Racing career
At age two, Phalanx  won the Remsen Handicap. At age three, after winning the Wood Memorial Stakes, he was the betting favorite going into the 1947 Kentucky Derby but ran second to Jet Pilot. and third to Faultless in the Preakness Stakes. In the final leg of U.S. Triple Crown series, Phalanx won the Belmont Stakes by five lengths. He also won the Dwyer Stakes, the Empire City Handicap and in the fall, the two-mile Jockey Club Gold Cup.

Racing in 1948, Phalanx finished second to Citation in the Jockey Club Gold Cup and in the Empire City International Gold Cup. He did not get his first win of the year until November 6, when he captured the Daingerfield Handicap at Jamaica Race Course carrying top weight of 129 pounds.

Stud record
Retired to owner Sonny Whitney's stud farm in Kentucky, Phalanx notably sired Career Boy, the 1956 American Champion Turf Horse, and Fisherman, a multiple top-level performer whose wins included the Travers Stakes and Washington, D.C. International Stakes.

Pedigree

References

1944 racehorse births
1971 racehorse deaths
Racehorses bred in Virginia
Racehorses trained in the United States
American Champion racehorses
Belmont Stakes winners
Thoroughbred family 17-b